Records and statistics in relation to the American soccer club MetroStars/New York Red Bulls. They were founded in 1995 as the New York/New Jersey MetroStars and played their first competitive match in the inaugural 1996 Major League Soccer season. In 2006 the club was renamed to the New York Red Bulls.

Honors
As of 2020 season

Conference
Eastern Conference
Runners Up (Playoffs) (3): 2014, 2015, 2018
Winners (Regular Season) (6): 2000, 2010, 2013, 2015, 2016, 2018
Runners Up (Regular Season): 2001
Western Conference
Winners (Playoff): 2008

Friendly
MLS Preseason Tournament: 2001
Atlantic Cup (9): 2003, 2010, 2011, 2013, 2015, 2017, 2018, 2019, 2020
La Manga Cup: 2004 
Walt Disney World Pro Soccer Classic: 2010
Emirates Cup: 2011

Records
As of March 13, 2022

Team
Victory: 7–0 v New York City FC, May 21, 2016 
 Draw with most goals: 5–5 v San Jose Earthquakes, May 8, 2004 
 Defeat: 0–6 v Kansas City Wizards, June 20, 1999 
 Most points in a season (3 pts per win): 71 (2018, 34 games) 
 Most victories in a season: 22 (2018) 
 Fewest victories in a season: 5 (2009)
 Most goals scored in MLS season (team): 64 (2000)

Individual

 Fastest goal scored: 7 seconds Mike Grella (2015)  
 Most goals scored in MLS game (player): 5 Clint Mathis v Dallas Burn, August 25, 2000 
 Most goals scored in MLS season (player): 27 Bradley Wright-Phillips (2014)  
 Most hat-tricks (Total): 5 Bradley Wright-Phillips 
 Most appearances (Total): 281 Luis Robles
 Most appearances (MLS): 239 Luis Robles
 Most appearances (Playoffs): 23 Luis Robles
 Most appearances (Open Cup): 14 John Wolyniec
 Most appearances (Continental): 15 Sean Davis, Luis Robles, Aaron Long
 Most goals scored (Total): 126 Bradley Wright-Phillips
 Most goals scored (MLS): 108 Bradley Wright-Phillips
 Most goals scored (Playoffs): 9 Bradley Wright-Phillips
 Most goals scored (Open Cup): 7 John Wolyniec
 Most goals scored (Continental): 4 Bradley Wright-Phillips, Daniel Royer

Managerial
 Most games managed (Total): 151 Jesse Marsch
 Most victories (Total): 76 Jesse Marsch
 Most losses (Total): 46 Octavio Zambrano
 Most draws (Total): 32 Hans Backe

Player records

All-time top 10 appearances 

As of March 18, 2023 (All competitive matches):  

Bold signifies current Red Bulls player

All-time top 10 goalscorers 

As of March 18, 2023 (All competitive matches):  

Bold signifies current Red Bulls player

All-time top 10 cleansheets 

As of March 18, 2023 (All competitive matches):  

Bold signifies current Red Bulls player

Coaching Records

Trophies

List of seasons

International results

By competition

By club
 (Includes: Copa Merconorte and CONCACAF Champions League)

By country
 (Includes: Copa Merconorte and CONCACAF Champions League)

By season

Transfers

As per MLS rules and regulations; some transfer fees have been undisclosed and are not included in the tables below.

Highest transfer fees paid

Highest transfer fees received

Individual Honors

Landon Donovan MVP Award

MLS Golden Boot

MLS Goalkeeper of the Year

MLS Defender of the Year

MLS Rookie of the Year

MLS Coach of the Year

MLS Goal of the Year

Designated Players

 
As of March 18, 2023 (All competitive matches):

FIFA World Cup Winners
  1990 FIFA World Cup:
Lothar Matthäus
  1994 FIFA World Cup:
Branco
  1998 FIFA World Cup:
Youri Djorkaeff
Thierry Henry

References 

New York Red Bulls
New York Red Bulls
New York Red Bulls records and statistics
New York Red Bulls records and statistics